Dega Nischal (born 19 October 1994) is an Indian cricketer. He made his first-class debut for Karnataka in the 2017–18 Ranji Trophy on 1 November 2017. Later the same month, in his second match, he scored his maiden first-class century, batting for Karnataka against Uttar Pradesh.

References

External links
 

1994 births
Living people
Indian cricketers
Place of birth missing (living people)
Karnataka cricketers